Ceratostomella is a genus of fungi in the Annulatascaceae family of the Ascomycota. The relationship of this taxon to other taxa within the Sordariomycetes class is unknown (incertae sedis), and it has not yet been placed with certainty into any order.

Species

Ceratostomella acoma
Ceratostomella albocoronata
Ceratostomella bambusina
Ceratostomella buxi
Ceratostomella canulata
Ceratostomella capillaris
Ceratostomella capilliformis
Ceratostomella castaneae
Ceratostomella catoniana
Ceratostomella comata
Ceratostomella conica
Ceratostomella coprogena
Ceratostomella cuspidata
Ceratostomella debaryana
Ceratostomella defectiva
Ceratostomella dispersa
Ceratostomella dubia
Ceratostomella echinata
Ceratostomella echinella
Ceratostomella excelsior
Ceratostomella exigua
Ceratostomella fallax
Ceratostomella fuscolutea
Ceratostomella hyalocoronata
Ceratostomella hyalostoma
Ceratostomella hydrophila
Ceratostomella hystricina
Ceratostomella imperfecta
Ceratostomella investita
Ceratostomella leptographioides
Ceratostomella leptorrhyncha
Ceratostomella lignorum
Ceratostomella maderensis
Ceratostomella majuscula
Ceratostomella mali
Ceratostomella merolinensis
Ceratostomella microcarpa
Ceratostomella multirostrata
Ceratostomella mycophila
Ceratostomella nyssicola
Ceratostomella piceiperda
Ceratostomella polyrrhyncha
Ceratostomella pseudotsugae
Ceratostomella pyrenaica
Ceratostomella rhynchophora
Ceratostomella rostrocylindrica
Ceratostomella schrenkiana
Ceratostomella similis
Ceratostomella stricta
Ceratostomella subdenudata
Ceratostomella subpilosa
Ceratostomella subsalsa
Ceratostomella trichina
Ceratostomella triseptata
Ceratostomella unedonis

References

External links

Sordariomycetes genera
Sordariomycetes enigmatic taxa